Takemura (written: 竹村 or, more rarely, 武村 or 武邑) is a Japanese surname. Notable people with the surname include:

 Hiroshi Takemura, Japanese voice actor
 Katsushi Takemura, Japanese professional wrestler
 Kiriko Takemura, Japanese singer and model, known under the pseudonym Kyary Pamyu Pamyu
 Masayoshi Takemura, Japanese politician
 Mitsuhiro Takemura, Japanese scholar
 Nobukazu Takemura, Japanese musician
 Takemura Yoemon, Japanese swordsman
 Yoshiya Takemura, Japanese football player

See also
 Takemura Station, a railway station in Toyota, Aichi Prefecture, Japan

Japanese-language surnames